Schellekens is a Dutch (mostly patronymic) surname. Schelleken was a diminutive of Germanic names like Schalk and Godschalk (=God's servant) in North Brabant. Dutch surnames similarly derived are Schalken, Schel(l), Schellens, and Scheltens.  People with these surnames include:

Schellekens
Anne Schellekens (born 1986), Dutch rower
Elisabeth Schellekens (born 1970s), British philosopher
Harry Schellekens (born 1952), Dutch football goalkeeper
Imke Schellekens (born 1977), Dutch equestrian
Maarten Schellekens, possible birth name of Martinus Becanus (1563–1624), Jesuit theologian
Paul Schellekens (born 1951), Dutch civil servant and diplomat
Schalken, Schalcken
Godfried Schalcken (1643–1706), Dutch genre and portrait painter
Sjeng Schalken (born 1976), Dutch tennis player
Schellens
 (born 1966), Belgian triathlete
Scheltens
Philip Scheltens (born 1957), Dutch neurologist

See also
Schalk
Schell, a surname with several origins

References

Dutch-language surnames
Patronymic surnames